Gonioctena notmani is a species of leaf beetle in the family Chrysomelidae.

References

Further reading

 
 

Chrysomelinae
Articles created by Qbugbot
Beetles described in 1924